Búhos UNISON F.C., previously Búhos de Hermosillo is a Mexican football team that plays in Hermosillo in the state of Sonora.

History

In 2004, a group of investors (Prospero Barboza Ochoa, Martín Trujillo Camacho, Alfonso & Álvaro Santacruz Pujol, Gilberto Cota Munguía and Alberto Arellano Chávez) legally created Club de Fútbol Búhos de Hermosillo, AC, with the club starting in the Tercera División de México that same year. The club earned promotion to the Segunda División in 2007, where they remained until 2011, when Ballenas Galeana Morelos purchased their spot in the league and the Búhos dissolved.

In 2021 the University of Sonora recovered the football team after a 10-year absence. The squad was registered in the Liga TDP, the league located at the fourth level of the Mexican professional football system.

Uniform

Stadium

When the team started they played at the stadium Miguel Castro Servín located in the campus of Universidad de Sonora. After Coyotes de Sonora, a team which played in the Primera División A, dissolved in 2006, the team took over at Estadio Héroe de Nacozari. In 2021 the team returned to stadium Miguel Castro Servín.

Players

Current Squad

Coaching staff

Manager:
 Manuel Ignacio Guerra Robles

Assistant Manager:
 José Torrecillas

Medic:
 Carlos Aceves

Past Managers

Enrique Ferreira Ramírez (Clausura 2004 - Clausura 2006)
Julio César Duarte Siqueiros (Clausura 2006 - Apertura 2007)
Víctor Manuel Márquez Ulloa (Apertura 2007 - Clasura 2008)

Honours

National

Campeón de Ascenso de la Tercera División de México: 1
Apertura 2006

Campeón Promocional de la Tercera División de México: 2
Apertura 2004, Clausura 2005

Subcampeón de Promocional de la Tercera División de México: 1
Torneo de Clausura 2004

References

External links
 Liga MX profile
Official Site

Football clubs in Sonora
Sport in Hermosillo
Association football clubs established in 2004
2004 establishments in Mexico